Everette is the name of:

Everette Brown (born 1987), American football linebacker
Everette Lee DeGolyer (1886–1956), Dallas oilman, geophysicist and philanthropist
Everette Harp (born 1961), blues, jazz, and gospel performer
Everette B. Howard (1873–1950), U.S. Representative from Oklahoma
Everette Howard Hunt (1918–2007), American author and spy known by E. Howard Hunt
Everette Maddox (1944–1989), New Orleans poet
Everette Stephens (born 1966), American professional basketball player
Leon Everette (born 1948), American country music artist

See also
 Everett (disambiguation)
 Everett (surname)
 Everett (given name)